Bulling may refer to:

Bulling (cattle), a behaviour seen in cattle
Bull polishing, a method for polishing leather  products
 Bullying

People called Bulling
 Anneliese Bulling (1900 - 2004), German–American art historian 
 Bud Bulling (1952 – 2014), American Baseball player 
 Ed Bulling (1889–1963), English professional footballer
 Pieter Bulling (born 1993}, a New Zealand racing cyclist